Furkan Aydın (born 22 February 1991) is a Turkish footballer.

Career 
He has played at Sakaryaspor all his life but only featuring in youth leagues. In the season 2007-2008 he had 22 appearances in the A2 League where he bagged 12 goals. He has also featured in the A2 League scoring 3 goals in 3 appearances.

He signed for Fenerbahçe on 15 January 2009, signing a three-year contract  but was allowed to see out the rest of the season at Sakaryaspor.

He was sent to Çankırı Belediye Spor on loan for the 2010/2011 season to gain some experience as a striker.

On 8 August 2012, he went on loan to Nazilli Belediyespor.

International 
Furkan was called up to Turkey U-17 in July 2008 where he played 3 international friendlies in 4 days and scored 2 goals.

References

External links

Goal.com profile

1991 births
Living people
Turkish footballers
Turkey youth international footballers
Sakaryaspor footballers
Fenerbahçe S.K. footballers
Bozüyükspor footballers
Nazilli Belediyespor footballers
Turgutluspor footballers
Eyüpspor footballers
İnegölspor footballers
Ofspor footballers
Association football forwards